The name Amy or Ami has been used for sixteen tropical cyclones worldwide: one in the Atlantic Ocean, two in the Australian region of the Indian Ocean, one in the South-West Indian Ocean, one in the South Pacific Ocean, and eleven in the Western Pacific Ocean.

In the Atlantic:
 Tropical Storm Amy (1975), neared the coast of North Carolina before turning out to sea

In the Australian region:
 Cyclone Amy (1967)
 Cyclone Amy (1980), struck Western Australia as a Category 5 cyclone

In the South-West Indian:
 Tropical Storm Amy (1962), passed near Rodrigues and brushed St. Brandon

In the South Pacific:
 Cyclone Ami (2003) (10P, 5F), made landfall on Vanua Levu before subsequently crossing the western tip of Taveuni and then traversing the Lau Group

In  the Western Pacific:
 Typhoon Amy (1951), struck the Central Philippines as a Category 4 typhoon
 Typhoon Amy (1956)
 Typhoon Amy (1959) (40W), struck Japan
 Typhoon Amy (1962), first made landfall in Taiwan as a Category 4 super typhoon, then in China as a typhoon; moved out into the South China Sea, and finally made landfall in South Korea as a tropical storm
 Typhoon Amy (1965) (7W, Elang),  brushed Japan
 Typhoon Amy (1967) (27W), remained over the open ocean
 Typhoon Amy (1971) (5W, Etang), traversed the Caroline Islands as a Category 5-equivalent super typhoon
 Tropical Storm Amy (1974)
 Tropical Storm Amy (1977) (9W, Ibiang), hit Taiwan
 Typhoon Amy (1991) (7W, Gening), Category 4 typhoon that brushed southern Taiwan and then made landfall in southern China
 Tropical Storm Amy (1994) (15W), made landfall in Vietnam

Atlantic hurricane set index articles
Australian region cyclone set index articles